Cupressus revealiana is a rare Mexican species of conifer in the cypress family, is endemic to a small area of the State of Baja California in northwestern Mexico.

The type locality is the Rincón de Santa Catarina, in the Sierra de Juárez of the Peninsular Ranges System.

Description
Cupressus revealiana is a tree up to 10 meters (33 feet) tall. It has red scaly bark.

Male cones are 3–4 mm long. Female cones are 15–20 mm long.

References

External links

revealiana
Flora of Baja California
Endemic flora of Mexico
Natural history of the California chaparral and woodlands
Natural history of the Peninsular Ranges
Plants described in 1981